Deer Park High School is a public high school in the town of Deer Park in suburban Long Island, New York. It is the only high school in the Deer Park School Union Free School District and serves students in grades 9–12.

Academics
In 2008, the school exceeded the state average passing rate in all nine of the New York State Regents Examinations test areas and students took AP examinations in 16 test areas. The school's 14.9 student-teacher ratio exceeds the 12.8 state average.

Notable alumni
Bob McCurdy – college basketball player, Class of 1970
Ray Searage, baseball player and coach, Class of 1973
Paul Becker, Naval Intelligence Officer and Director for Intelligence of The Joint Chiefs of Staff, Class of 1979 
Joe Valentine – baseball player, Class of 1997 
Kathleen Herles – voice actress, original voice of Dora on Dora the Explorer, Class of 2008

Feeder patterns
Students enter the school after completing eighth grade at Robert Frost Middle School, the only middle school in the district.

References

External links
Deer Park High School website
Deer Park School Union Free School District website
Greatschools - Deer Park High School
School Matters - Deer Park High School

Public high schools in New York (state)
Schools in Suffolk County, New York